Chhotelal Kharwar is a member of the Bharatiya Janata Party and has won the 2014 Indian general elections from the Robertsganj. He is currently a National Council member of the Bharatiya Janata Party from Sonbhadra.

References

1972 births
Living people
India MPs 2014–2019
Indian Hindus
People from Chandauli
Dalit politicians
Bharatiya Janata Party politicians from Uttar Pradesh

Lok Sabha members from Uttar Pradesh